Byron Herbert Reece (September 14, 1917 – June 3, 1958) was an American poet and novelist. During his life, he published four volumes of poetry and two volumes of fiction.

Reece wrote the words of his legacy in four lines:

From chips and shards, in idle times,
I made these stories, shaped these rhymes;
May they engage some friendly tongue
When I am past the reach of song.

Life 
Born in Union County, Georgia on September 14, 1917, Reece began publishing poems locally while in high school, receiving his first widespread publication in 1943 with the publication of "Lest the Lonesome Bird" in the Prairie Schooner journal. Ballad of the Bones and Other Poems, collecting Reece's poetry, soon followed, in 1945. He published Bow Down in Jericho, his 1950 follow-up to that first, critically acclaimed publication. That same year, Reece published Better a Dinner of Herbs, his first novel. In 1952, he received a Guggenheim Fellowship  for fiction. 1952 also saw a third volume of poetry, A Song of Joy, while 1955 brought his second novel, The Hawk and the Sun and his final volume of poetry, The Season of Flesh. On June 3, 1958, Reece committed suicide at the age of forty, responding to illness and depression. During his final years, Reece also taught classes at Young Harris College to earn extra money. He was found in his office, with Wolfgang Amadeus Mozart playing on the record player and his final set of student papers graded and neatly stacked in the desk drawer.

Personality 
In a career cut short by illness and suicide, Byron Herbert Reece produced an enduring body of poetry and fiction from the sounds and spirits of his North Georgia homeland. His five volumes of verse draw deeply from the lyrical wellsprings of Nature and the Bible, twin legacies of an upbringing in the agricultural uplands of Union County, around Blairsville. His two novels, in turn, are remarkable regional portraits - one a mountain family drama of overland journey to Old Testament rhythms, the other a morality play of a small-town lynching.

Reece was a bright and solitary schoolboy, a graduate of Blairsville High School who grew up in such rural isolation, the story goes, that he never saw a car until he was eight or twelve (depending on the version). He attended Young Harris College and taught school intermittently between 1935 and 1942, producing poem after poem for small journals and newspapers even while his parents’ tuberculosis led him to take increasing responsibility for the family farm. During these years, Atlanta Constitution editor Ralph McGill and Kentucky writer Jesse Stuart - themselves offspring of the rural Appalachians - early recognized Reece’s talent. He won American Poet magazine’s annual poetry award in 1943, and with Stuart’s sponsorship H.P. Dutton published Reece’s first volume of poetry, Ballad of the Bones, in 1945. By 1952, Reece  had been profiled in a national magazine (Newsweek), and tendered a position as poet-in-residence at UCLA.

In the short decade of success Reece saw before illness, financial insecurity, and loss took their ultimate toll on him, he was much honored in his home state. Five times he received the Georgia Writers Association’s literary achievement award, and he served as poet-in-residence at both Young Harris College and Emory University. His books and honors never yielded much in money, however, and Reece’s labors never long allayed the financial worries that attended the harsh circumstances of the farm and family illness. He was teaching part-time at Young Harris to make ends meet, in fact, when depression and illness wore him down and Reece took his own life on June 3, 1958, three months shy of his forty-first birthday.

Honors and legacy 
Reece received Guggenheim Fellowships for fiction in 1952 and 1957.

The Georgia Writers Hall of Fame inducted Reece in 2001.

In 2003 a group of writers formed the Byron Herbert Reece Society to preserve and promote Reece's legacy. In 2004, the Society began working on constructing a museum to the writer on the site of his family farm, which is owned by Union County, and the museum and grounds are now open to visitors.  The Byron Herbert Reece Farm and Heritage Center in Blairsville, Georgia tells the story of Reece's life, and shows Appalachian farming techniques from the early 20th century.  Features of the farm include a Poetry Trail Garden, Mulberry Hall (the poet's writing studio), and five barn buildings housing 13 exhibits.

Reece's life story is at the center of Georgia's state drama, The Reach of Song, which depicts life between World War I and World War II in the Appalachian Mountains.

The Byron Herbert Reece Society petitioned the Georgia General Assembly to name Reece “Georgia’s Appalachian Poet/Novelist" and to designate Highway 129 from Blairsville to Neels Gap "The Byron Herbert Reece Memorial Highway.”  This was accomplished through the Georgia General Assembly's HR 295 which was passed in 2005.

Works

Poetry
 Ballad of the Bones, and Other Poems - New York: E. P. Dutton & Company, Inc., 1945; Atlanta: Cherokee Publishing Company, 1985 
 Bow Down in Jericho - New York: E. P. Dutton & Company, Inc., 1950; Atlanta: Cherokee Publishing Company, 1985
 A Song of Joy - New York: E. P. Dutton & Company, Inc., 1952; Atlanta: Cherokee Publishing Company, 1985
 The Season of Flesh - New York: E. P. Dutton & Company, Inc., 1955; Atlanta: Cherokee Publishing Company, 1985

Novels
 Better a Dinner of Herbs - New York: E. P. Dutton & Company, Inc., 1950; Athens: The University of Georgia Press, 1992 
 The Hawk and the Sun - New York: E. P. Dutton & Company, Inc., 1955; Athens: The University of Georgia Press, 1994

Books about Reece 
 Mountain Singer: The Life and the Legacy of Byron Herbert Reece by Raymond C. Cook / Atlanta: Cherokee Publishing Company, 1980 
 The Bitter Berry: The Life of Byron Herbert Reece - by Bettie M. Sellers. / Athens: The University of Georgia Press, 1993
 Byron Herbert Reece: 1917-1958 and the Southern Poetry Tradition by Alan Jackson / Edwin Mellen Press, 2001
 Fable in the Blood. The Selected Poems of Byron Herbert Reece Edited by Jim Clark / Athens: The University of Georgia Press, 2002

References

External links 
 Byron Herbert Reece, The New Georgia Encyclopedia
 Byron Herbert Reece Society
 

1917 births
1958 deaths
20th-century American novelists
American male novelists
20th-century American poets
Schoolteachers from Georgia (U.S. state)
Novelists from Georgia (U.S. state)
People from Union County, Georgia
Young Harris College alumni
American male short story writers
American male poets
20th-century American short story writers
Suicides in Georgia (U.S. state)
Poets from Georgia (U.S. state)
20th-century American male writers
20th-century American educators
1958 suicides